Sanctuary is an original novel based on the U.S. television series Angel.

Plot summary
Angel and Co. are enjoying some downtime at the karaoke bar Caritas when a loud explosion occurs. The gang and the rest of the bar are attracted outside. A building nearby is on fire. It seems that it may have been a diversionary tactic to distract from a drive-by shooting. When the smoke clears, Fred has gone missing.

It seems Fred has been kidnapped, so Team Angel questions everyone nearby. Around a dozen demons were direct eyewitnesses, but each one has a different story. Whether it was gangs, monsters, or a runaway Fred, the team soon realize demons do not make the most reliable eyewitnesses.

Continuity

Supposed to be set early in Angel season 3 before episode "That Old Gang of Mine".
Characters include: Angel, Cordelia Chase, Wesley Wyndam-Pryce, Charles Gunn, Winifred Burkle, Lorne.

Canonical issues

Angel books such as this one are not usually considered by fans as canonical. Some fans consider them stories from the imaginations of authors and artists, while other fans consider them as taking place in an alternative fictional reality. However unlike fan fiction, overviews summarising their story, written early in the writing process, were 'approved' by both Fox and Joss Whedon (or his office), and the books were therefore later published as officially Buffy/Angel merchandise.

External links

Reviews
Litefoot1969.bravepages.com - Review of this book by Litefoot
Teen-books.com - Reviews of this book

Angel (1999 TV series) novels
2003 American novels
2003 fantasy novels
Novels by Jeff Mariotte